Aliaksandr Bury and Igor Zelenay were the defending champions but chose to defend their title with different partners. Bury partnered Ariel Behar but lost in the quarterfinals to Guillermo Durán and Andrés Molteni. Zelenay partnered Julian Knowle but lost in the first round to David Marrero and Leander Paes.

Durán and Molteni win the title after defeating Roman Jebavý and Hans Podlipnik-Castillo 7–6(7–5), 6–7(5–7), [10–6] in the final.

Seeds

Draw

External Links
 Main Draw

UniCredit Czech Open - Doubles
2017 Doubles